Union Sportive de Tébessa, known as US Tébessa , or simply UST for short, is an Algerian football club based in the city of Tébessa. The club was founded in 1936 and its colours are yellow and black. Their home stadium, 4 March 1956 Stadium, has a capacity of 11,000 spectators. The club is currently playing in the Ligue Nationale du Football Amateur.

Stadium
Currently the team plays at the Stade du 4 mars.

References

External links

:fr:Union sportive de Tébessa

Football clubs in Algeria
Association football clubs established in 1936
1936 establishments in Algeria
Sports clubs in Algeria